The Trusted Computing Group is a group formed in 2003 as the successor to the Trusted Computing Platform Alliance which was previously formed in 1999 to implement Trusted Computing concepts across personal computers. Members include Intel, AMD, IBM, Microsoft, and Cisco.

The core idea of trusted computing is to give hardware manufacturers control over what software does and does not run on a system by refusing to run unsigned software.

History 
On October 11, 1999, the Trusted Computing Platform Alliance (abbreviated as TCPA), a consortium of various technology companies including Compaq, Hewlett-Packard, IBM, Intel, and Microsoft, was formed in an effort to promote trust and security in the personal computing platform. In November 1999, the TCPA announced that over 70 leading hardware and software companies joined the alliance in the first month. On January 30, 2001, version 1.0 of the Trusted Computing Platform Specifications was released IBM was the first original equipment manufacturer to incorporate hardware features based on the specifications with the introduction of its ThinkPad T30 mobile computer in 2002.

In 2003, the TCPA was succeeded by the Trusted Computing Group, with an increased emphasis on mobile devices.

Membership fees vary by level. Promoters pay annual membership fees of $30,000, contributors pay $15,000, and depending upon company size, adopters pay annual membership fees of either $2,500 or $7,500.

Overview 
TCG's most successful effort was the development of a Trusted Platform Module (TPM), a semiconductor intellectual property core or integrated circuit that conforms to the specification to enable trusted computing features in computers and mobile devices. Related efforts involved Trusted Network Connect, to bring trusted computing to network connections, and Storage Core Architecture / Security Subsystem Class, to bring trusted computing to disk drives and other storage devices. These efforts have not achieved the same level of widespread adoption as the trusted platform module.

Criticism

The group has faced widescale opposition from the free software community on the grounds that the technology they are developing has a negative impact on the users' privacy and can create customer lock-in, especially if it is used to create DRM applications. It has received criticism from the Linux and FreeBSD communities, as well as the software development community in general. Significant backlash included Richard Stallman's speech at the 2006 Hackers on Planet Earth conference Stallman calls Trusted Computing "Treacherous Computing" instead and warns that it allows vendors to lock out software, rendering it unusable.

Privacy concerns were heightened when Christopher Tarnovsky presented methods to access and compromise the Infineon TPM non-volatile memory capacity which contains user data at Black Hat 2010.

ISO standardization
In 2009 ISO/EIC release trusted platform module standards
 ISO/IEC 11889-1:2009 Information technology—Trusted Platform Module—Part 1: Overview
 ISO/IEC 11889-2:2009 Information technology—Trusted Platform Module—Part 2: Design principles
 ISO/IEC 11889-3:2009 Information technology—Trusted Platform Module—Part 3: Structures
 ISO/IEC 11889-4:2009 Information technology—Trusted Platform Module—Part 4: Commands

References

External links
 

 
Computer security organizations
Trade associations based in the United States
Companies based in Beaverton, Oregon
Computer companies established in 2003
American companies established in 2003
2003 establishments in Oregon